Domažlice District is a district in the Plzeň Region of the Czech Republic. Its capital is the town of Domažlice.

Administrative division
Domažlice District is divided into two administrative districts of municipalities with extended competence: Domažlice and Horšovský Týn.

List of municipalities
Towns are marked in bold and market towns in italics:

Babylon -
Bělá nad Radbuzou -
Blížejov -
Brnířov -
Čermná -
Česká Kubice -
Chocomyšl -
Chodov -
Chodská Lhota -
Chrastavice -
Díly -
Domažlice -
Drahotín -
Draženov -
Hlohová -
Hlohovčice -
Hora Svatého Václava -
Horšovský Týn -
Hostouň -
Hradiště -
Hvožďany -
Kanice -
Kaničky -
Kdyně -
Klenčí pod Čerchovem -
Koloveč -
Kout na Šumavě -
Křenovy -
Libkov -
Loučim -
Luženičky -
Meclov -
Mezholezy (former Domažlice District) -
Mezholezy (former Horšovský Týn District) -
Milavče -
Mířkov -
Mnichov -
Močerady -
Mrákov -
Mutěnín -
Nemanice -
Němčice -
Nevolice -
Nová Ves -
Nový Kramolín -
Osvračín -
Otov -
Pařezov -
Pasečnice -
Pec -
Pelechy -
Poběžovice -
Pocinovice -
Poděvousy -
Postřekov -
Puclice -
Rybník -
Semněvice -
Spáňov -
Srbice -
Srby -
Staňkov -
Stráž -
Tlumačov -
Trhanov -
Úboč -
Újezd -
Únějovice -
Úsilov -
Velký Malahov -
Vidice -
Vlkanov -
Všepadly -
Všeruby -
Zahořany -
Ždánov

Geography

Domažlice District borders Germany in the west. The terrain is hilly and along the state border, the landscape is mountainous. The territory extends into five geomorphological mesoregions: Upper Palatine Forest (west), Upper Palatine Forest Foothills (north and centre), Plasy Uplands (northeast), Cham-Furth Depression (south) and Švihov Highlands (east).

The only important river is the Radbuza, which springs in the western part of the district and flows across the district to east. The Chamb also springs here. There are no large bodies of water in the territory.

There is one protected landscape area: the southern half of Český les.

Demographics

Most populated municipalities

Economy
The largest employers with its headquarters in Domažlice District and at least 500 employers are:

Transport
There are no motorways passing through the district. The most important road is the I/26 from Plzeň to the Czech-German border via Horšovský Týn.

Sights

The most important monuments in the district, protected as national cultural monuments, are:
Horšovský Týn Castle
Augustinian monastery in Mnichov-Pivoň

The best-preserved settlements, protected as monument reservations and monument zones, are:

Domažlice (monument reservation)
Horšovský Týn (monument reservation)
Poběžovice
Kanice
Klenčí pod Čerchovem
Pocinovice
Stráž
Trhanov

The most visited tourist destination is the Horšovský Týn Castle.

Notes

References

External links

Domažlice District profile on the Czech Statistical Office's website

 
Districts of the Czech Republic